Patricia Annie Kaliati is a Malawian politician and former educator who has held various ministerial positions in the Cabinet of Malawi.

Early life and education

Patricia Kaliati was born in 1967 in the village Nkando, Mulanje, Southern Region, Malawi. She trained as a teacher in 1988 receiving a  Primary School Teaching Certificate from Bembeke Teachers College and later obtained a Diploma in Human Resource Management. Upon completion of her formal education, she taught in primary and secondary schools from 1993 to 1999. 
She is a staunch Catholic.

Political career
In the 1999 general election Patricia Kaliati was elected Member of Parliament for Mulanje West Constituency on a United Democratic Front ticket, a position she continues to hold. 
In 2000 she was appointed Deputy Minister of Health to the Bakili Muluzi administration.  Kaliati was then shuffled to Deputy Minister of National Public Events (2002–2004) and then Deputy Minister of Local Government. She was re-elected in 2004 and was appointed Minister of Information and Tourism, renamed Minister of Information and Civic Education in May 2007, holding that position until May 2009.

In the May 2009 elections Patricia Kaliati was again elected on the Democratic Progressive Party ticket.
Kaliati was appointed Minister of Gender, Children and Community Development in the cabinet that became effective on 15 June 2009.
She was dropped from the cabinet on 9 August 2010. 
She was appointed Minister of Information and Civic Education in September 2011.

Controversy

Kaliati has been an outspoken and controversial member of the cabinet.
In February 2012 Kaliati condemned the Weekend Times tabloid for its page 8 "Action Girl", which she described as pornographic and misogynistic. 
In 1999, Kaliati reportedly used government funds to provide education bursaries for children of her key supporters and to help win election in Mulanje in 2009.  The subsequent investigation of Kaliati by Malawi's Anti Corruption Bureau was stalled in response to political influence.  

In March 2012 she was accused of threatening a journalist who had written an article critical of her performance in the cabinet.
After the death of President Bingu wa Mutharika, she was involved in a constitutional crisis in Malawi and was dubbed as one of the 'midnight six'. President wa Mutharika died on April 5, 2012 and there was an attempted constitutional coup that she is connected to. On 6 April 2012 Kaliati addressed a press conference as government spokesperson,
She said "Honourable Joyce Banda is not eligible to take over the leadership of this country because she formed her own party". 
Joyce Banda was sworn in as President the next day.

Personal life
As of 2009 Patricia Kaliati was married with four children.

References

1967 births
Living people
People from Mulanje District
Malawian Roman Catholics
United Democratic Front (Malawi) politicians
Democratic Progressive Party (Malawi) politicians
Government ministers of Malawi
Members of the National Assembly (Malawi)
Women government ministers of Malawi